Rio Vista Airport was a public airport located northeast of Rio Vista, serving Solano County, California, USA. This general aviation airport had two runways. It was closed in 1995 after the 1993 opening of its successor, Rio Vista Municipal Airport.

See also 
List of airports in California
List of airports in the San Francisco Bay Area

At one time there was a unique restaurant on the airfield, named: Flying down to Rio (see film of the same name).  A DC4 had been lifted to the airport by river barge and set up as a restaurant.

References 

Defunct airports in California
Airports in Solano County, California